The French frigate Iphigénie was a first rank frigate of the French Navy. Launched in Toulon in 1827, she took part in the Battle of Veracruz, and was eventually broken up in 1900.

Career 
Launched in Toulon on 3 May 1827, Iphigénie was commissioned on 27 September.

In 1838, under Captain Alexandre Ferdinand Parseval-Deschenes, she was part of a frigate squadron under Charles Baudin and took part in the Battle of Veracruz, where she was the third ship in the French line of battle.

Between 1844 and 1850, Iphigénie was used as a schoolship in Toulon. She was decommissioned on 1 July 1872 and used as a mooring hulk.

Renamed to Druide in 1877, she was struck in 1891, and broken up in 1900.

Notes and references

References

 Sail Frigates (1st class, 60 guns, launched 1825-47)

1827 ships
Age of Sail frigates of France
Frigates of the French Navy